Formin is a village east of Ptuj in northeastern Slovenia. It lies in the Municipality of Gorišnica between the right bank of the Pesnica River and an artificial canal of the Drava River, created for use by the Formin hydroelectric power plant, built south of the settlement in 1978. The area traditionally belonged to the Styria region. It is now included in the Drava Statistical Region.

There is a small chapel-shrine in the settlement. It was built in 1914.

References

External links 
 Formin on Geopedia

Populated places in the Municipality of Gorišnica